Interface:2010 is The Interface Marketing Supplier Integration Institute, widely known as INTERFACE and IMSI, is an international-standard-setting body composed of representatives from various national marketing and supply chain management organizations. Founded on 11 March 2009, the organization promulgates worldwide proprietary marketing supplier integration standards. It is headquartered in Geneva, Switzerland. While IMSI defines itself as a non-governmental organization, its ability to improve the marketing supply chain, reduce costs   and eliminate risk makes the IMSI highly influential within the government sector.

IMSI enables sophisticated suppliers of marketing services such as fulfillment providers, call centers and online marketers to integrate the back office functions of data transfer, CRM and billing. Enabling partner organizations to provide end to end marketing service supply chain management. The standards enable IMSI approved organizations to offer a seamless service and billing environment to clients looking for streamlined management of their direct marketing and CRM activity. The IMSI aims to deliver a single point of contact, billing ( if required) and accountability to end users, while still enabling clients to access specialist service providers.
Member organisations are generally but not exclusively also ISO accredited.

The standard fully complies with the PCI DSS standards.

Member Organisations 
Impact Lists (marketing data, mailing lists, business lists)
The Prospect Shop (marketing data, mailing lists, targeting advice)
URSA Communications (full service advertising agency)
Unity4 (remote agent call centre services)
Premium Fulfilment Services(Australia's leading provider of product management systems)
Rapportcms (Call centre technology)
Partizan Patient Support (medical patient support and adherence services)
Morgan & Dunn (Consumer Credit, Commercial Debt Recovery)
Marquecoms (PCI DSS Consultancy & Audit Services)

See also 

PCI DSS, Payment Card Industry Data Security Standard
American National Standards Institute (ANSI)
Deutsches Institut für Normung, German Institute for Standardization (DIN)
British Standards Institution (BSI)
Countries in International Organization for Standardization
Canadian Standards Association
European Committee for Standardization (CEN)
Commonwealth of Independent States (CIS) set of standards (GOST)
International Classification for Standards
International Electrotechnical Commission (IEC) and ISO/IEC standards
International healthcare accreditation
International Telecommunication Union (ITU)
ISO 216
ISO country code
List of ISO standards
 ISO divisions
 ISO/TC 37
 ISO/TC 68
 TC 46/SC 9
 ISO/TC 211
 ISO/TC 215
 ISO/TC 223
Standardization
Standards Australia
Standards organization
Terminology planning policy
The International Customer Service Institute (TICSI)
CARICOM Regional Organisation for Standards and Quality (CROSQ)
AP Stylebook (Associated Press Style)
Interface:2010 (Interface Marketing Supplier Integration Institute)

References

External links 
Available Standards (free access to a small subset of the standards)

Standards organisations in Switzerland